Shawn Stefani (born December 2, 1981) is an American professional golfer, currently playing on the PGA Tour.

Born in Baytown, Texas, Stefani played college golf at Lamar University, graduating in 2005. He turned professional that year and played on mini-tours until 2012, when he joined the Web.com Tour and won twice. He got his first tour win at the Midwest Classic in August, and his second in October at the Miccosukee Championship. He finished sixth on the 2012 money list to earn his PGA Tour card for the 2013 season.

During the final round of the U.S. Open in 2013 at Merion, Stefani carded a hole-in-one on the  17th hole, the first ace ever recorded in 18 USGA championships held at Merion. His 4-iron tee shot bounced off the slope left of the green and rolled a considerable distance into the cup.

Professional wins (3)

Web.com Tour wins (2)

Other wins (1)
2011 Texas State Open

Playoff record
PGA Tour playoff record (0–1)

Results in major championships

CUT = missed the half-way cut
"T" indicates a tie for a place

See also
2012 Web.com Tour graduates
2017 Web.com Tour Finals graduates
2018 Web.com Tour Finals graduates

References

External links

American male golfers
Lamar Cardinals golfers
PGA Tour golfers
Korn Ferry Tour graduates
Golfers from Houston
People from Baytown, Texas
1981 births
Living people